Hana Růžičková (18 February 1941 – 29 May 1981) was a Czech gymnast. She was part of Czech teams that won silver medals at the 1960 and in the 1964 Summer Olympics. Her best individual results were fifth place all-round in 1964 and fifth place on the balance beam in 1964.

References

External links

 
 
 

1941 births
1981 deaths
Czech female artistic gymnasts
Olympic gymnasts of Czechoslovakia
Gymnasts at the 1960 Summer Olympics
Gymnasts at the 1964 Summer Olympics
Olympic silver medalists for Czechoslovakia
Olympic medalists in gymnastics
Medalists at the 1964 Summer Olympics
Medalists at the 1960 Summer Olympics
Medalists at the World Artistic Gymnastics Championships
People from Prague-West District
Sportspeople from the Central Bohemian Region